AFV may refer to:

Entertainment

 Addams Family Values, a 1993 U.S. movie
 America's Funniest Home Videos, a U.S. television show

Political

 The Artistic Freedom Voucher, a proposal by economist Dean Baker as an alternative to increasing fines for downloading copyright material
 American Family Voices, an American political organization
 Alianza Fidelidad por Veracruz (English: Fidelity Alliance for Veracruz), an electoral alliance that fought the 2007 election in the Mexican state of Veracruz

Transportation and vehicles

 Armoured fighting vehicle, a class of military combat vehicles
 Alternative fuel vehicle, a self-propelled vehicle that uses renewable and zero-emission energy
 Ansdell and Fairhaven railway station, Lancashire, England (National Rail codename AFV)
 Air Afrique Vacances (ICAO airline code: AFV), see List of airline codes (A)

See also